Sir Matthew John Rycroft  (born 16 June 1968) is a British civil servant and diplomat serving as Permanent Under-Secretary of State at the Home Office since 2020, appointed following the resignation of Sir Philip Rutnam. Rycroft previously served as Permanent Secretary at the Department for International Development (DFID) from 2018 to 2020 and as the Permanent Representative to the United Nations in New York from 2015 to 2018.

Early life and education
Rycroft was born in Southampton, before moving to Cambridge at the age of eleven. He studied mathematics and philosophy at Merton College, Oxford.

Career
Rycroft joined the Foreign and Commonwealth Office (FCO) after graduation, in 1989. Following short spells in Geneva and on the NATO desk in Whitehall, Rycroft spent four years at the British embassy in Paris. In 1995–96, Rycroft was Head of Section in the Eastern Adriatic Unit at the FCO: a demanding role, given the aftermath of the Yugoslav Wars. Very soon after taking up this role, he served as a member of the British deputation to the Dayton peace talks. Between 1996 and 1998 he was a desk officer in the FCO Policy Planners.

In 1998, he joined the British embassy in the United States, where he served for four years. In 2002, Rycroft was appointed Private Secretary to Prime Minister Tony Blair, to advise him on matters related to foreign policy, the European Union, Northern Ireland and defence. During this time Rycroft wrote a letter to Mark Sedwill, private secretary to the foreign secretary, Jack Straw. The letter reveals that "we and the US would take action" without a new resolution by the UN security council if UN weapons inspectors showed Saddam had clearly breached an earlier resolution. In that case, he "would not have a second chance". That was the only way Britain could persuade the Bush administration to agree to a role for the UN and continuing work by UN weapons inspectors, the letter says. Dated 17 October 2002. "This letter is sensitive," Rycroft underlined. "It must be seen only by those with a real need to know its contents, and must not be copied further."

It was in this capacity that Rycroft issued the "Downing Street memo". During his time in Downing Street, in 2003, he was made a CBE.

From March 2005 to July 2008, Rycroft served as Ambassador to Bosnia and Herzegovina. In July 2008, he was appointed EU Director in the Foreign and Commonwealth Office, and then, in 2011, he became Chief Operating Officer. He became Permanent Representative to the United Nations in New York in April 2015.

Downing Street memo
Rycroft's name became familiar to the general public as the author of a secret memo to the British Ambassador to the United States, David Manning, summarizing a 23 July 2002 meeting with Blair and other government officials "to discuss Iraq". The memo was leaked to The Sunday Times, which printed it on 1 May 2005.

The memo includes discussion of a "shift of attitude" in the Bush administration which made it appear that at this point, while the public was still being told that Iraq could avoid an invasion by agreeing to abide by UN resolutions,

Military action was now seen as inevitable.

Furthermore, the memo went on to state,

Bush wanted to remove Saddam, through military action, justified by the conjunction of terrorism and WMD. But the intelligence and facts were being fixed around the policy. The NSC had no patience with the UN route, and no enthusiasm for publishing material on the Iraqi regime's record. There was little discussion in Washington of the aftermath after military action.

bolstering the assertions of opponents of Bush and Blair that the invasion had been decided a priori, the intelligence to support the invasion had been slanted towards that purpose, and that there had been insufficient planning for the aftermath. This was even more explicitly stated elsewhere in the memo,

The Foreign Secretary said he would discuss this with Colin Powell this week. It seemed clear that Bush had made up his mind to take military action, even if the timing was not yet decided. But the case was thin. Saddam was not threatening his neighbours, and his WMD capability was less than that of Libya, North Korea or Iran.

Permanent Secretary at DFID and HO

Rycroft was appointed Permanent Secretary at the Department for International Development with effect from January 2018.
Rycroft replaced Mark Lowcock who ran the department from 2011. He was appointed Permanent Secretary of the Home Office in March 2020 following the resignation of Sir Philip Rutnam.

Rycroft was appointed Knight Commander of the Order of St Michael and St George (KCMG) in the 2023 New Year Honours for services to British diplomacy, development and domestic policy.

References

External links
RYCROFT, Matthew John, Who's Who 2014, A & C Black, 2014; online edn, Oxford University Press, Dec 2013
Matthew Rycroft, Esq, CBE Authorised Biography – Debrett's People of Today

1968 births
Living people
Alumni of Merton College, Oxford
Stances and opinions regarding the Iraq War
Ambassadors of the United Kingdom to Bosnia and Herzegovina
Permanent Representatives of the United Kingdom to the United Nations
Commanders of the Order of the British Empire
Permanent Under-Secretaries of State for International Development
Permanent Under-Secretaries of State for the Home Department
Knights Commander of the Order of St Michael and St George